Suzanne M. Daley is an American journalist who is the associate managing editor for international print for The New York Times. She was national editor from 2005 to 2010. In early 2010 she returned to reporting with responsibility for special assignment feature writing across Europe.

Daley joined the Times in 1978 after graduating from Hampshire College.

Daley's previous posts include:
 reporter, metropolitan desk (1982–94)
 deputy metropolitan editor (1994–95)
 South Africa bureau chief, based in Johannesburg (1995–99)
 Paris bureau chief (1999–2002)
 education editor (2002–2005)
 national editor (2005–2010)
 European correspondent (2010–2016)

Personal
Daley was previously married to Donald McNeil Jr., then a science reporter for the Times. They have two daughters, named Avery and Galen.

Her father Robert and grandfather Arthur were both sports writers for the Times. Her grandfather won a Pulitzer Prize for a Sports of the Times column in 1956.

Notes

1956 births
Living people
Hampshire College alumni
American women journalists
The New York Times editors
Place of birth missing (living people)
20th-century American journalists
20th-century American women
21st-century American women